Pnina Salzman (Hebrew: פנינה זלצמן) (February 24, 1922, Tel Aviv, Mandate Palestine – December 16, 2006, Tel Aviv, Israel) was an Israeli classical pianist and piano pedagogue.

Salzman showed an early aptitude for the piano, and gave her first recital at the age of eight. The French pianist and teacher, Alfred Cortot, heard her play in 1932 while she was a student at Shulamit Conservatory and invited her to Paris to study. She graduated at the Ecole Normale de Musique then became a pupil of Magda Tagliaferro at the Conservatoire de Paris, where she was to win the Premier Prix de Piano in 1938, aged 16.

It was through the violinist Bronislaw Huberman that she first developed a lifelong association with the Israel Philharmonic Orchestra, which Huberman had founded.

In 1963 she became the first Israeli to be invited to play in the USSR and in 1994, the first Israeli pianist invited to play in China. Besides performing as a soloist, she was a member of the Israel Piano Quartet.

She was a Professor and the head of the piano department at Tel Aviv University and served on the jury of many piano competitions, including the Arthur Rubinstein, Vladimir Horowitz, Marguerite Long and Paloma O'Shea Santander International Piano Competition. 
She taught piano to many students, including Dror Elimelech, Nimrod David Pfeffer, Elisha Abas, Iddo Bar-Shai and Yossi Reshef.

Awards
In 2006, Salzman was awarded the Israel Prize for music.

See also 
List of Israel Prize recipients

References

External links
 Hagai Hitron, Pianist Pnina Salzman dies at 84, Haaretz

1922 births
2006 deaths
Israeli classical pianists
Israeli women pianists
Israel Prize in music recipients
Israel Prize women recipients
Jewish classical pianists
Musicians from Tel Aviv
20th-century classical pianists
Women classical pianists
Burials at Yarkon Cemetery
20th-century women pianists